Taupo-nui-a-Tia College is a co-educational high school in Taupo, New Zealand. The school currently has about 1050 students. Taupo-nui-a-Tia College is a Cornerstone Values school.

Academic performance
Taupo-nui-a-Tia College is ranked as one of the top performing schools in the central North Island, with NCEA results being above the national average for a decile 5 school. This school achieved steady results in the 2011 New Zealand Scholarship exams, particularly in economics where two outstanding scholarships were gained.

Sport
Taupo-nui-a-Tia College is held in high regard for its tradition of sporting achievement from many young sportsmen and sportswomen within the school. There is an impressive line-up of national achievers and some students, have gone on to represent their country on the world stage with their chosen sport. There are over 30 different sports codes in the school. The top performing sportsmen and sportswomen are invited to join the High Performance Programme, in order to aid them in their sporting careers.

Performing arts
Taupo-nui-a-Tia College is renowned for its strength in the performing arts field, with NCEA Subjects in Music, Drama, and Dance. In 2011, the school reached the national finals of Stage Challenge. Recent productions in the school include Rock of Ages, High School Musical, Footloose and Little Shop of Horrors. The college has many different music groups, including an a cappella group, Performing Arts Club, TNT Jazz band (usually formed at the start of Term 3) and also a combined schools Wind Band for young musicians around Taupo. Able music students are also invited to join the High Performance Music Extension Programme, in order to receive further tuition in their desired instrument.

New buildings
In 2011, the rebuilding of a new school gym was completed, it has a 21st-century touch, complete with a Dance Studio, larger gym arena and newer changing rooms. In 2012, the new Design and Innovation technology centre was opened by Prime Minister John Key. This building is two stories high, with state of the art 21st century type classrooms, Two commercial kitchens, specialist computer suites, and also an elevator. John Key stated that this building will be a major forefront in the innovation of newer school buildings around New Zealand.

Houses
Tauhara (Red)
Ngauruhoe (Blue)
Ruapehu (Green)
Tongariro (Yellow)

Notable alumni

Paula Bennett - 18th Deputy Prime Minister of New Zealand
David Hamilton - New Zealand Composer
Louisa Wall - Member of Parliament
Lee Stensness - All Black
Hud Rickit - All Black
Shiloh Gloyn - Black Stick
Nicole van der Kaay - Triathlete
Mani Mitchell - Activist

References

External links
Taupo-nui-a-Tia College

Secondary schools in Waikato
Taupō
Schools in the Taupo District
1960 establishments in New Zealand
Educational institutions established in 1960